Naubaisa Gaon is a census town in Jorhat district in the Indian state of Assam.

Demographics
 India census, Naubaisa Gaon had a population of 5042. Males constitute 51% of the population and females 49%. Naubaisa Gaon has an average literacy rate of 81%, higher than the national average of 59.5%: male literacy is 88%, and female literacy is 74%. In Naubaisa Gaon, 8% of the population is under 6 years of age.

References

Cities and towns in Jorhat district
Jorhat